Mill Meadows may refer to

 Mill Meadows, Billericay
 Mill Meadows, Henley-on-Thames